Jetti Geeta Reddy (born 1947) is an Indian gynecologist and politician of the Indian National Congress. She served as member of the Telangana Legislative Assembly representing the Zahirabad constituency of Sangareddy district from 2014 to 2018. She is the working president of Telangana Pradesh Congress Committee since July 2021.

Reddy has been a minister in the cabinets of various governments. She was also leader of the INC in the legislative assembly during the government of Konijeti Rosaiah.

Early life
Geeta Reddy is the daughter of Eshwari Bai, a former Member of the Legislative Assembly (MLA) and President of the Republican Party of India. She studied medicine at Osmania Medical College, Hyderabad and became a Member of the Royal College of Obstetricians and Gynaecologists, London in 1989.

Career
Reddy worked as a gynaecologist. She lived in Australia from 1971 to 1977, in London from 1977 to 1980 and in Saudi Arabia from 1980 to 1982. She then returned to India.

Political career
Reddy and her husband, Ramachandra Reddy, established a medical practice in Saudi Arabia. In 1985, upon the request of Rajiv Gandhi, the couple returned to India so that Geeta could work on behalf of the Indian National Congress party. She contested elections for the Andhra Pradesh Legislative Assembly in 1989 and became MLA for Gajwel in Medak district. She won that constituency again in  2004.

In the 2009 elections, Reddy was parachuted into the Zahirabad constituency, which had elected INC candidates in every election bar one since 1957. Converted to a seat reserved for candidates from the Scheduled Castes, the constituency had been held for a decade by the INC's Mohammed Fareeduddin, who commanded much local respect but was forced by this decision to contest the election elsewhere and lost. She won the seat and did so again in 2014, despite allegations that Fareeduddin had been encouraging his local supporters to vote for any party except the INC. On this occasion, the election was for a seat in the newly created Telangana Legislative Assembly that was created as part of the bifurcation of Andhra Pradesh.

Reddy was a minister in the cabinets of Marri Chenna Reddy, Kotla Vijaya Bhaskara Reddy and Y. S. Rajasekhar Reddy. She was INC leader in the legislative assembly during the Rosaiah government.

Member of Legislative Assembly

Portfolios held
 1989–1994: Minister for Tourism, Culture, Social Welfare, Sports, Secondary Education and Protocol.
 1995–1998: General Secretary, Pradesh Congress Committee (PCC)
 1998–2000: Executive Member of PCC
 2000–2004: President, Andhra Pradesh Mahila Congress Committee.
 2004–2009: Minister for Tourism, Sugar and Major Industries commerce and Export promotion.
 2009–2010: Minister for Information and Public relations, Tourism, Culture, FDC, Archaeology, Museums & Archives, Cinematography.
 2010–2014: Minister for Major Industries, Sugar, Commerce and Export promotion

Reddy was also for some time around 2013 in charge of the Home department in the Andhra Pradesh government whilst also holding the Major Industries portfolio. In the same year, the Telugu Desam Party had demanded that she be dismissed as a minister due to her being one of the co-accused named by the Central Bureau of Investigation in its work on a case relating to alleged illegal assets held by Y. S. Jaganmohan Reddy. The matter was dropped, with one of her co-accused, Mopidevi Venkataramana Rao, claiming that the Chief Minister, Kiran Kumar Reddy, had intervened.

In April 2016, Reddy was appointed chairman of the Telangana Legislative Assembly's Public Accounts Committee.

Personal life
J. Geeta Reddy is married to Dr. Ramachandra Reddy. Her husband owns Geetha Multi Speciality Hospital Secunderabad, Eashwari Bai Memorial Center Hospital, Eashwari Bai School Of Nursing and Eashwari Bai College Of Nursing. She has a daughter.

Around 1980, after Reddy's husband had suffered a stroke and was not responding well to conventional medicine, the couple visited Sathya Sai Baba. She has expressed admiration for him, noting that her husband's health began to improve soon after the meeting, and has been described as a devotee.

Sports
 President of Andhra Pradesh Women's Cricket Association

Social service
 Vice President Indian Red Cross Society, Andhra Pradesh
Branch, Life Trustee, Indian Council of Child Welfare
 Chairperson, Eashwari Bai Memorial Trust.
 Former member of Central Social Welfare Board.
 Former Senate member of Osmania University.

Awards
 Mahila Shiromani
 Unity award for National Integration Forum
 2008: Indira Gandhi Sadbhavana Award
 2008: Millennium Star Award
 2014: ALL Ladies League, Hyderabad Women of the Decade Achievers Award for Excellence in Public Administration

References
Notes

Citations

Indian National Congress politicians from Telangana
Politicians from Hyderabad, India
Women in Telangana politics
People from Medak
Living people
1947 births
Andhra Pradesh MLAs 1989–1994
Andhra Pradesh MLAs 2004–2009
Andhra Pradesh MLAs 2009–2014
Telangana MLAs 2014–2018
Osmania University alumni
21st-century Indian medical doctors
Indian women gynaecologists
20th-century Indian women politicians
21st-century Indian women politicians
Dalit women
Dalit politicians
Medical doctors from Hyderabad, India
20th-century Indian women physicians
21st-century women physicians